James Robert Qualls (born October 9, 1946) is an American former professional baseball player who appeared in 63 games in Major League Baseball as an outfielder and pinch-hitting specialist for the Chicago Cubs, Montreal Expos and Chicago White Sox. He also played in two seasons in Japan (–) for the Kintetsu Buffaloes.

Qualls began his pro career in the Cubs' organization in 1964 after graduating from Tulare Western High School. After five years in the minor leagues, he made the MLB roster in 1969 and played 43 games for the Cubs, most of them in utility and pinch-hitting roles. He is best remembered for hitting a one-out single in the top of the ninth inning to break up Tom Seaver's bid for a perfect game in the New York Mets' 4–0 victory over the Cubs at Shea Stadium on July 9, 1969.

Qualls collected 31 hits during his MLB career, including five doubles and three triples, batting .223 with ten runs batted in. In NPB, he hit .252 with 15 home runs in 162 games played with Kintetsu.

References

External links

1946 births
Living people
American expatriate baseball players in Canada
American expatriate baseball players in Japan
Baseball players from California
Buffalo Bisons (minor league) players
Chicago Cubs players
Chicago White Sox players
Indianapolis Indians players
Kintetsu Buffaloes players
Lodi Crushers players
Major League Baseball outfielders
Montreal Expos players
People from Exeter, California
Quincy Cubs players
San Antonio Missions players
Tacoma Cubs players
Treasure Valley Cubs players
Tucson Toros players
Winnipeg Whips players
California National Guard personnel